Dillon "Curley" Russell (19 March 1917 – 3 July 1986) was an American jazz musician, who played bass on many bebop recordings.

He was born in New York, United States. He was nicknamed "Curley" for his curly hair. 

A member of the Tadd Dameron Sextet, he was in demand for his ability to play at the rapid tempos typical of bebop, and appears on several key recordings of the period. He left the music business in the late 1950s.

On May 1, 1951, Russell played in the recording session for "Un Poco Loco", composed by American jazz pianist Bud Powell, with Max Roach on drums. Literary critic Harold Bloom included this performance on his short list of the greatest works of twentieth-century American art.

According to jazz historian Phil Schaap, the classic bebop tune "Donna Lee", a contrafact on "Back Home Again in Indiana", was named after Curley's daughter. In 2002, she donated her father's bass to the Institute of Jazz Studies at Rutgers University.

He died of emphysema at Queens General Hospital at the age of 69 in 1986.

Discography

As sideman
 Charlie Parker: The Charlie Parker Story (Savoy Records, 1945)
 Charlie Parker: Memorial Vol. 1 (Savoy, 1947); Memorial Vol. 2 (Savoy 1947–48)
 Sonny Stitt: Sonny Stitt/Bud Powell/J. J. Johnson (Prestige, 1949–50 [1956]) – with Bud Powell
 Bud Powell: Jazz Giant (Verve, 1950)
 Fats Navarro: The Fabulous Fats Navarro (Blue Note Records, 1947–49)
 Miles Davis: The Real Birth of the Cool (Bandstand, 1948)
 Stan Getz: Early Stan (OJC, 1949–53)
 George Wallington: Trio (Savoy, 1949–51); Trios (OJC, 1952–53)
 Milt Jackson: Roll 'Em Bags (Savoy, 1949–56)
 Al Cohn: Cohn's Tones (OJC, 1950–53)
 Dexter Gordon: Dexter Rides Again (Savoy, 1950)
 Zoot Sims: Quartets (OJC, 1950)
 Bud Powell: The Amazing Bud Powell (Blue Note, 1951–53)
 Charlie Parker & Dizzy Gillespie: Bird and Diz (Verve, 1952)
 Coleman Hawkins: Disorder at the Border (Spotlite, 1952 [1973])
 Thelonious Monk: Thelonious Monk Trio/Blue Monk (Prestige Records, 1952–54); MONK (OJC, 1953–54)
 Al Cohn: Al Cohn's Tones (Savoy, 1953 [1956])
 Kenny Drew: New Faces, New Sounds (Blue Note, 1953)
 Horace Silver: Horace Silver Trio (Blue Note, 1953)
 Art Blakey: A Night at Birdland Vol. 1 (Blue Note, 1954)
 Art Blakey: A Night at Birdland Vol. 2 (Blue Note, 1954)
 Art Blakey: A Night at Birdland Vol. 3 (Blue Note, 1954)
 Jay Jay Johnson: The Birdlanders (Fresh Sound, 1954)
 Thelonious Monk: Monk (Prestige, 1954)
 Johnny Griffin: Introducing Johnny Griffin (Blue Note, 1957)
 Cliff Jordan & John Gilmore: Blowing in from Chicago (Blue Note, 1957)

References

1917 births
1986 deaths
American jazz double-bassists
Male double-bassists
20th-century American musicians
20th-century double-bassists
20th-century American male musicians
American male jazz musicians